The R348 road is a regional road in Ireland stretching east–west for  along a route north of the R446. It leaves the R446 east of Oranmore and rejoins it in Ballinasloe. The full length of the road lies within County Galway.

The route passes through the southern end of Athenry and several small villages.

See also
Roads in Ireland
National primary road
National secondary road

References
Roads Act 1993 (Classification of Regional Roads) Order 2006 – Department of Transport

Regional roads in the Republic of Ireland
Roads in County Galway